Chérie FM is a French radio station created in 1987 and belongs to the NRJ Group.

History
Chérie FM is created in 1987 in Paris by Jean-Paul Baudecroux on the then defunct frequency of Gilda la Radiopolitaine. Chérie FM then started broadcasting nationally in 1989 when the NRJ Group acquires the frequencies of Pacific FM. Most frequencies of the station were affiliated to Chérie FM (but the Parisian frequency of Pacific FM was used to create Rire & Chansons).

In 1992, the NRJ Group decides to expand the Chérie FM network outside France, to launch Chérie FM Belgique in Belgium broadcasting only in French in Wallonia and Brussels. Chérie FM stopped broadcasting in May 2008, after 16 years of activity.

A variant of the radio station on TV is launched by the NRJ Group on 12 December 2012, and is named Chérie 25. It broadcasts in France on TNT and in high definition. However, the programming is different from that of the radio station. Chérie 25 aims primarily to a female audience like Chérie FM, but the programming schedule includes magazines, documentaries as well as entertainment, TV series and movies.

Identity of Chérie FM

Slogans
Since the creation of Chérie FM, several slogans were used:
 From 1990 till 1999: Écoutez, vous allez chanter ! or Si vous l'écoutez, vous allez chanter ! (Listen, you will sing!)
 From 1999 till 2000: Jamais la musique ne vous aura fait autant de bien ! (Music never made you feel so good!)
 From 2000 till 2004: Toutes vos chansons préférées (All your favorite songs)
 From 2004 till May 2007: Douceur, émotion, passion (Softness, Emotion, Passion)
 From May 2007 till 2010: Les hits qui font battre mon cœur (The hits that make my heart beat)
 From 2000 till November 2012: Vos plus belles émotions (The most beautiful emotions)
 November 2012 till April 2019: Pop Love Music
 Since April 2019: La Plus Belle Musique (The Most Beautiful Music)

Webradios

Chérie FM is, like its sister station Nostalgie, offering 33 webradios specialized in various genres:
 Chérie FM (main station)
 Chérie 80's
 Chérie 90's
 Chérie At Work
 Chérie Acoustic
 Chérie Adele
 Chérie Ballads
 Chérie Ed Sheeran
 Chérie Fitness
 Chérie Frenchy
 Chérie Jazzy
 Chérie Latino
 Chérie Les Plus Belles Voix
 Chérie Live
 Chérie Katy Perry
 Chérie Love Songs
 Chérie No Repeat
 Chérie Nouvelle Scène
 Chérie Nouveautés
 Chérie Party
 Chérie Pop
 Chérie Pop Ballads
 Chérie R'n'B Chic
 Chérie Romantic
 Chérie Sweet Home
 Chérie Zen
 Chérie Running
 Chérie Italie

Former or periodic
 Chérie 1200 Émotions
 Chérie After Work (now: Sweet Home)
 Chérie Baby
 Chérie by A.Manoukian
 Chérie Cinéma
 Chérie Cook
 Chérie FM Garden Party
 Chérie Golds
 Chérie Italia (periodic)
 Chérie Noël (periodic)
 Chérie Piano Jazz
 Chérie Romantic
 Chérie Sade
 Chérie Saint Valentin (periodic)
 Chérie FM Sunshine
 Chérie Tropique

External links
  
  NRJ Group : official website

References

Radio stations in France
Radio stations established in 1987
French companies established in 1987